Erjon Rizvanolli (born 14 August 1981) is an Albanian retired football player. The striker had three different spells with Shkumbini Peqin.

Club career
Rizvanolli previously played for Croatian side NK Zagreb, appearing in seven Prva HNL matches during the 2001–02 and 2002–03 seasons.

References

External links
 Profile -  FSHF

1981 births
Living people
Footballers from Tirana
Albanian footballers
Association football forwards
Albania under-21 international footballers
KF Tirana players
NK Zagreb players
FK Dinamo Tirana players
KS Shkumbini Peqin players
FC Tatabánya players
KF Elbasani players
KS Kastrioti players
KF Vllaznia Shkodër players
Besëlidhja Lezhë players
Kategoria e Parë players
Kategoria Superiore players
Albanian expatriate footballers
Expatriate footballers in Croatia
Albanian expatriate sportspeople in Croatia
Expatriate footballers in Hungary
Albanian expatriate sportspeople in Hungary